This is the discography of DJs, Jump Smokers.

Studio albums

Extended plays

Singles

As lead artist

As featured artist

Other charted songs

Guest appearances

Remixes 
2009
 Three 6 Mafia, Sean Kingston and Flo Rida vs. Tiësto – "Feel It" (Jump Smokers Remix)
 Rihanna – "Hard" (Jump Smokers Remix)
 Nick Cannon featuring Akon – "Famous" (Jump Smokers Dirty Remix)
 Mariah Carey – "H.A.T.E.U." (Jump Smokers Remix)
 Rihanna – "Russian Roulette" (Jump Smokers Remix)
 Mariah Carey – "Obsessed" (Jump Smokers Remix)
 Space Cowboy featuring Paradiso Girls and Far East Movement – "I Came 2 Party" (Jump Smokers Remix)
 Beyoncé – "Why Don't You Love Me" (Jump Smokers Remix)
 Vassy – "History" (Jump Smokers Remix)
 Three 6 Mafia featuring Kalenna – "Shake My" (Jump Smokers Remix)
 Baby Bash featuring Pitbull – "Outta Control" (Jump Smokers Remix)
 New Boyz – "You're a Jerk" (Jump Smokers Remix)

2010
 Tino Coury – "Up Against the Wall" (Jump Smokers Remix)
 Mariah Carey – "Oh Santa!" (Jump Smokers Remix)
 Kim Sozzi – "Rated R" (Jump Smokers Remix)
 P!nk – "Raise Your Glass" (Jump Smokers Remix)
 Katy Perry – "Firework" (Jump Smokers Remix)
 Flo Rida featuring Nelly Furtado - "Jump" (Jump Smokers Remix)
 Jesse McCartney – "Shake" (Jump Smokers Remix)
 Matisse – "Better Than Her" (Jump Smokers Remix)
 Cara Quici – "Away from You" (Jump Smokers Remix)
 Taio Cruz featuring Ke$ha & Fabolous – "Dirty Picture" (Jump Smokers Remix)
 Sean Kingston featuring Nicki Minaj – "Letting Go (Dutty Love)" (Jump Smokers Remix)
 Riz – "She Loves Me" (Jump Smokers Remix)
 Travis Garland – "Believe" (Jump Smokers Remix)
 Jason Derulo – "Ridin Solo" (Jump Smokers Remix)
 Crystal Waters – "Masquerade" (Jump Smokers Remix)
 School Gyrls – "Something Like a Party" (Jump Smokers Remix)
 Alexis Jordan – "Happiness" (Jump Smokers Remix)

2011
 Pitbull, Mariah Carey, Ne-Yo – "Angels Cry" (Jump Smokers Remix)
 Pitbull featuring Chris Brown – "International Love" (Jump Smokers Remix)
 Jessie J – "Domino" (Jump Smokers Remix)
 Britney Spears – "I Wanna Go" (Jump Smokers Remix)
 Denis Naidanow featuring Lil Jon and Baby Bash – "Shuri Shuri (Let's Get Loco)" (Jump Smokers Remix)
 L2 – "Insomnia" (Jump Smokers Remix)
 Sardar – "Party Life" (Jump Smokers Remix)
 Jessie and the Toy Boys – "Naughty" (Jump Smokers Remix)
 Enrique Iglesias featuring Pitbull and The WAV.s – "I Like How It Feels" (Jump Smokers Remix)
 Jay Sean featuring Nicki Minaj – "2012 (It Ain't the End)" (Jump Smokers Extended Remix)
 Taio Cruz featuring Flo Rida – "Hangover" (Jump Smokers Remix)
 Britney Spears – "Till the World Ends" (Jump Smokers Remix)
 Alyssa Reid featuring Jump Smokers – "Alone Again" (Jump Smokers LATE NITE Mix)
 Angelica Salem – "We Rock the World" (Jump Smokers Remix)
 Lloyd featuring Andre 3000 – "Dedication to My Ex (Miss That)" (Jump Smokers Remix)
 Selena Gomez – "Love You Like a Love Song" (Jump Smokers Remix)
 Jessica Sutta – "Show Me" (Jump Smokers Remix)
 Joe Jonas – "Love Slayer" (Jump Smokers Remix)
 Clinton Sparks featuring LMFAO and JoJo – "Sucks to Be You" (Jump Smokers Remix)
 Porcelain Black featuring Lil Wayne – "What Rock N Roll Looks Like" (Jump Smokers Remix)
 Sahara featuring Shaggy – "Champagne" (Jump Smokers Remix)
 Colette Carr – "Primo" (Jump Smokers Remix)
 Kat DeLuna – "Drop It Low" (Jump Smokers Remix)
 Lee Lee – "BoomBada" (Jump Smokers Remix)
 Mia Martina – "Latin Moon" (Jump Smokers Remix)
 Pitbull featuring Ne-Yo, Afrojack and Nayer – "Give Me Everything" (Jump Smokers Remix)
 Yenn – "Pretty Ugly" (Jump Smokers Remix)
 Riz featuring Pitbull – "Dance with Me" (Jump Smokers Remix)
 Christian TV – "Love 2 Baby" (Jump Smokers Remix)
 Willow Smith – "21st Century Girl" (Jump Smokers Remix)
 Britney Spears – "Hold It Against Me" (Jump Smokers Remix)
 Jay Sean featuring Lil Wayne – "Hit the Lights" (Jump Smokers Remix)
 Big Time Rush featuring Snoop Dogg – "Boyfriend" (Jump Smokers Remix)
 Ricky Martin featuring Joss Stone – "The Best Thing About Me Is You" (Jump Smokers Remix)
 Alexis Jordan – "Good Girl" (Jump Smokers Remix)

2012
 Pitbull featuring TJR – "Don't Stop the Party" (Jump Smokers Remix)
 One Direction – "Live While We're Young" (Jump Smokers Remix)
 Thalia – "Manías" (Jump Smokers Remix)
 Pitbull featuring Shakira – "Get It Started" (Jump Smokers Remix)
 Jay Sean featuring Pitbull – "I'm All Yours" (Jump Smokers Remix)
 Karmin – "Hello" (Jump Smokers Remix)
 Far East Movement featuring Tyga – "Dirty Bass" (Jump Smokers Remix)
 Timbaland featuring Dev – "Break Ya Back" (Jump Smokers Remix)
 Manika - “Take a Little Give a Little” (Jump Smokers Remix)
 Katy Perry – "Wide Awake" – (Jump Smokers Remix)
 Che’Nelle - “Carry Your Heart” (Jump Smokers Remix)
 Selena Gomez & the Scene – "Hit the Lights" (Jump Smokers Remix)
 Speakers – "And Her Too" (Jump Smokers Remix)
 Cosmo – "Naughty Party" (Jump Smokers Remix)
 Rita Ora – "How We Do (Party)" (Jump Smokers Remix)
 Carly Rae Jepsen vs. Calvin Harris – "Feel So Maybe" (Jump Smokers Bootleg)
 Katharine McPhee – "Touch Me" (Jump Smokers Remix)
 Labrinth – "Earthquake" (Jump Smokers Remix)
 The Ready Set - "Give Me Your Hand (Best Song Ever)" (Jump Smokers Remix)

2013
 Pitbull featuring Kesha – "Timber" (Jump Smokers Remix)
 Fall Out Boy – "Alone Together" (Jump Smokers Remix)
 Zendaya – "Replay" (Jump Smokers Remix)
 Rod Stewart - “Sexual Religion” (Jump Smokers Remix)
 Enrique Iglesias - “Heart Attack (Enrique Iglesias Song) (Jump Smokers Remix)
 Lawson - Learn to Love Again (Jump Smokers Remix)
 Cassio Monroe - Shake (Jump Smokers Remix)
 Pitbull (rapper) featuring Christina Aguilera - Feel This Moment (Jump Smokers Remix)
 Christina Aguilera - “Let There More Love” (Jump Smokers Remix)
 Celine Dion – "Loved Me Back to Life" (Jump Smokers Remix)
 Calvin Harris featuring Ayah Marar – "Thinking About You" (Jump Smokers Remix)
 Thalía featuring Prince Royce – "Te Perdiste Mi Amor" (Jump Smokers Remix)
 Jamie Drastik featuring Pitbull (rapper) and Havana Brown - Chasing Shadows (Jump Smokers Remix)
 Justin Timberlake featuring Jay-Z – "Suit & Tie" (Jump Smokers Remix)
 Che'Nelle – "It's Happening Again" (Jump Smokers Remix)
 Selena Gomez – "Come & Get It" (Jump Smokers Remix)
 One Direction – "Best Song Ever" (Jump Smokers Remix)
 Demi Lovato – "Neon Lights" (Jump Smokers Remix)

2014
 Taylor Swift – "Blank Space" (Jump Smokers Remix)
 Becky G – "Shower" (Jump Smokers Remix)
 Demi Lovato – "Really Don't Care" (Jump Smokers Remix)
 Austin Mahone featuring Pitbull – "Mmm Yeah" (Jump Smokers Remix)
 Mariah Carey – "You're Mine (Eternal)" (Jump Smokers Extended Remix)
 Cash Cash featuring John Rzeznik - "Lightning" (Jump Smokers Remix)
 Bebe Rexha - I Can’t Stop Drinking About You (Jump Smokers Remix)
 Cole Plante featuring Ruby O'Dell - If I Fall (Jump Smokers Remix)
 Cassio Monroe - “Under The Lights” (Jump Smokers Remix)
 Pitbull (rapper) featuring G.R.L. - Wild Wild Love (Jump Smokers Remix)

2015
 Play-N-Skillz featuring Redfoo, Lil Jon and Enertia McFly – "Literally I Can't" (Jump Smokers Remix)
 Charli XCX – "Doing It" (Jump Smokers Remix)
 [[Pitbull (rapper) featuring Ne-Yo “Time of Our Lives” (Jump Smokers Remix)
 Nathan Sykes – "Kiss Me Quick" (Jump Smokers Remix)
 Icona Pop – "Emergency" (Jump Smokers Remix)
 Demi Lovato – "Cool for the Summer" (Jump Smokers Remix)
 Nelly featuring Jeremih – "The Fix" (Jump Smokers Remix)
 Nathan Sykes – "Over and Over Again" (Jump Smokers Remix)
 Nick Jonas – "Levels" (Jump Smokers Remix)
 Jenni Nicole – "Money in the Bag" (Jump Smokers Remix)
 Pitbull featuring Chris Brown – "Fun" (Jump Smokers Remix)
 Ricky Martin featuring Pitbull – "Mr. Put It Down" (Jump Smokers Remix)

2016
 Shawn Hook – "Sound of Your Heart" (Jump Smokers Remix)
 Hailee Steinfeld featuring DNCE – "Rock Bottom" (Jump Smokers Remix)
 Justin Bieber – "Love Yourself" (Jump Smokers Remix)
 99 Souls featuring Destiny's Child and Brandy – "The Girl Is Mine" (Jump Smokers Remix)
 DNCE – "Cake by the Ocean" (Jump Smokers Remix)
 ZAYN – "Pillowtalk" (Jump Smokers Remix)
 Nytrix featuring Dev – "Electric Walk" (Jump Smokers Remix)
 Machine Gun Kelly featuring Camila Cabello - "Bad Things" (Jump Smokers Remix)

References

Discographies of American artists